A spatula is a cooking utensil.

Spatula may also refer to:
A utensil for scientific work
Frosting spatula, used for frosting cakes
Fish slice (kitchen utensil)
Putty knife, used (by tradesmen) for spreading materials such as window putty, plaster or paint
Palette knife, used (by artists) for spreading or mixing paints (and other art mediums)
Spatulae (biology), nanometer-scale projections covering the setae on the footpads of geckos
Spatula (bird), a genus of ducks